Gregg Township is one of fourteen townships in Morgan County, Indiana, United States. As of the 2010 census, its population was 2,930 and it contained 1,161 housing units.

History
The Hall School and Wilbur School are listed on the National Register of Historic Places.

Geography

Unincorporated towns
 Briarwood at 
 Hall at 
 Mount Zion Corner at 
 Wilbur at 
(This list is based on USGS data and may include former settlements.)

Cemeteries
The township contains these three marked cemeteries: Highland, Mount Pleasant and Mount Zion.

Callahan Cemetery is unmarked, located at 39°31'00.1"N 86°33'18.0"W.

Lakes
 Whippoorwill Lake
 Briarwood Lake

School districts
 Monroe-Gregg School District

Political districts
 Indiana's 4th congressional district
 State House District 47
 State Senate District 37

References
 
 United States Census Bureau 2008 TIGER/Line Shapefiles
 IndianaMap

External links
 Indiana Township Association
 United Township Association of Indiana
 City-Data.com page for Gregg Township

Townships in Morgan County, Indiana
Townships in Indiana